The Destruction of Troy is a 1678 tragedy by the English writer John Banks. It was first staged by the Duke's Company at the Dorset Garden Theatre in London. It depicts the Trojan War as inspired by Homer's Iliad.

The original cast included Samuel Sandford as Priamus, Henry Harris as Hector, John Crosby as Paris, Joseph Williams as Troilus, Matthew Medbourne as Agamemnon, Thomas Betterton as  Achilles, William Smith as Ulysses, Thomas Gillow as  Diomedes, John Bowman as Patroclus, Henry Norris as Menelaus, Cave Underhill as Ajax, Emily Price as Helena, Mary Betterton as Andromache, Elizabeth Barry as Polyxena and Mary Lee as Cassandra.

References

Bibliography
 Van Lennep, W. The London Stage, 1660-1800: Volume One, 1660-1700. Southern Illinois University Press, 1960.

1678 plays
West End plays
Tragedy plays
Plays by John Banks
Plays based on the Iliad